Thomas Baker was a nineteenth-century composer and musical producer.

A violinist, Baker came to the United States from England with the orchestra of Louis Antoine Jullien in 1853. His first Broadway production, Novelty, opened at Laura Keene's Variety House on February 22, 1856.

In 1861, Baker published the first "sheet-music publication of any black spiritual", Song of the Contrabands. His efforts were later criticized as betraying a lack of knowledge of black music, for having "turned the slave song into a parlor ballad in 6/8 time".

He was credited with writing the music for the 1866 stage production The Black Crook, which premiered at Niblo's Garden in New York City, using a melodrama and a French ballet troupe whose venue burnt to the ground while they still rehearsed. The "result was an unprecedented triumph", and was one of the major events in the early history of the extravaganza. The production "is frequently cited as the first real precursor to the twentieth-century musical".

Baker also arranged musical productions of Cinderella and Aladdin. He wrote the music for a number of productions at the Olympic Theatre in New York. The last play for which he arranged and directed the music was titled Diplomacy and was produced on 1 April 1878.

See also
 The Seven Sisters (1860)
 The Black Crook (1866)

References

Further reading

External links
 

Year of birth missing
Year of death missing
19th-century composers
Music directors
British musical theatre composers